SSA Global Technologies (previous NASDAQ symbol: SSAG) was a company developing Enterprise resource planning (ERP) software.  On May 15, 2006, SSA Global announced that it would be acquired by Infor Global Solutions. The acquisition was completed on July 28, 2006.

Acquisitions 
Max International in April, 2001
interBiz Product Group, previously a division of Computer Associates International Inc.  in April, 2002
Infinium Software in December, 2002
Ironside Technologies, in June, 2003
Elevon Inc, in July, 2003
Baan, in July, 2003
EXE Technologies, in December, 2003
Arzoon, Inc., in June, 2004
Marcam, in July, 2004
Boniva, in August, 2005
Epiphany, in September, 2005
Provia Software, in March, 2006

Products 
 Baan
 BPCS
 ERP LN 
 ERP LX 
 Corporate performance management
 Customer Relationship Management
 Financial Management
 Human Capital Management
 Product Lifecycle Management
 Supply Chain Management
 Supplier Relationship Management
 Warehouse Management System

References

External links 
 Company homepage

2006 mergers and acquisitions
Defunct software companies of the United States
Customer relationship management software companies
ERP software companies
Companies based in Chicago
Software companies established in 1981
Software companies disestablished in 2006